Estoloides is a genus of longhorn beetles of the subfamily Lamiinae.

Species 
Estoloides contains the following species:
 Estoloides affinis Breuning, 1940
 Estoloides alboscutellaris Breuning, 1943
 Estoloides andresi (Breuning, 1974)
 Estoloides annulicornis Breuning, 1940
 Estoloides aquilonius Linsley & Chemsak, 1984
 Estoloides basigranulata Breuning, 1943
 Estoloides bellefontanei Touroult, 2012
 Estoloides chamelae Chemsak & Noguera, 1993
 Estoloides chiapensis Santos-Silva, Wappes & Galileo, 2018
 Estoloides costaricensis Breuning, 1940
 Estoloides dthomasi Santos-Silva, Wappes & Galileo, 2018
 Estoloides elongata Bezark, Botero & Santos-Silva, 2022
 Estoloides esthlogenoides Breuning, 1943
 Estoloides flavoscutellaris Galileo, Bezark & Santos-Silva, 2016
 Estoloides fulvitarsis (Bates, 1885)
 Estoloides galapagoensis (Blair, 1933)
 Estoloides giesberti Santos-Silva, Wappes & Galileo, 2018
 Estoloides grossepunctata Breuning, 1940
 Estoloides jaliscana Heffern, Nascimento & Santos-Silva, 2018
 Estoloides leucosticta (Bates, 1885)
 Estoloides longicornis Breuning, 1940
 Estoloides maesi Santos-Silva, Wappes & Galileo, 2018
 Estoloides medioplagiata Vitali, 2007
 Estoloides medvegyi Audureau, 2020
 Estoloides morrisi Santos-Silva, Wappes & Galileo, 2018
 Estoloides nayeliae Santos-Silva, Wappes & Galileo, 2018
 Estoloides noguerai Santos-Silva, Wappes & Galileo, 2018
 Estoloides paralboscutellaris Breuning, 1971
 Estoloides pararufipes Breuning, 1974
 Estoloides parva Breuning, 1940
 Estoloides perforata (Bates, 1872)
 Estoloides prolongata (Bates, 1885)
 Estoloides pubescens Santos-Silva, Wappes & Galileo, 2018
 Estoloides reflexa Breuning, 1940
 Estoloides rufipes Breuning, 1940
 Estoloides scabracaulis Chemsak & Noguera, 1993
 Estoloides schusteri Santos-Silva, Wappes & Galileo, 2018
 Estoloides sinaloana Heffern, Santos-Silva & Botero, 2019
 Estoloides sordida (LeConte, 1873)
 Estoloides sparsa Linsley, 1942
 Estoloides strandiella Breuning, 1940
 Estoloides uyucana Santos-Silva, Wappes & Galileo, 2018
 Estoloides vandenberghei Santos-Silva, Wappes & Galileo, 2018
 Estoloides venezuelensis Breuning, 1942

References

 
Desmiphorini